Saint-Juire-Champgillon is a commune in the Vendée department in the Pays de la Loire region in western France.

Geography
The river Smagne forms most of the commune's southern border.

commune in the Vendée department in the Pays de la Loire region in western France.

See also
Communes of the Vendée department
 L'Arbre, le maire et la médiathèque, a 1993 film set in Saint-Juire-Champgillon

References

Communes of Vendée